Ruchita Misra is an Indian writer and author. She was born and raised in Lucknow, Uttar Pradesh.

She was awarded the Awadh Samman in 2012 for her contribution to the field of literature by the Government of Uttar Pradesh and Zee TV.

An MBA and Triple gold medalist from the Indian Institute of Foreign Trade, New Delhi, she has previously worked with Bharti Telecom and now lives and works in London.

Early life and education 
Ruchita Misra was born and brought up in Lucknow. She did her schooling from La Martinière College, Lucknow. She did her B.Tech from Institute of Engineering and Technology, Lucknow and was rank 1. Later she joined the Indian Institute of Foreign Trade for her MBA and was awarded three gold medals including the Best Outgoing Student Medal.

Work 
Ruchita Misra has authored four books till date.

 The (In)eligible Bachelors (Rupa & Co., 2012)
 I Do! Do I? (HarperCollins, 2014)
 "Second chance at love" (HarperCollins, 2015)
 "Someone to Love" (HarperCollins, 2017)

Awards 
 Awadh Samman 2012: Foreign her contributions to the field of Literature.

References 

1984 births
Living people
Writers from Lucknow
People from Lucknow district